The Earl Douglass Workshop-Laboratory was used by Earl Douglass, the discoverer of the dinosaur bone deposits at the dinosaur quarry in Dinosaur National Monument, to preserve, study and prepare fossil specimens. It was built about 1920 by Carnegie Museum of Natural History personnel who were working at the site in eastern Utah.

The workshop was placed on the National Register of Historic Places on December 16, 1986.

References

External links
 Earl Douglass at Dinosaur National Monument, National Park Service

Buildings and structures in Uintah County, Utah
Buildings and structures on the National Register of Historic Places in Utah
National Register of Historic Places in Dinosaur National Monument
Buildings and structures completed in 1920
National Register of Historic Places in Uintah County, Utah